"Acapella" is a song by Czech singer Mikolas Josef featuring vocals from Panamanian-Canadian Tropical Urban singer-songwriter Fito Blanko and Mexican-American singer, songwriter and rapper Frankie J. It was released as a Digital download on 24 May 2019 by Vivienne Records. The song was written by Jenson Vaughan, Francisco Bautista, Sarah Raba, Christophe Vitorino De Almeida, Walid Benmerieme, Mikoláš Josef and Roberto Testa.

Background
In April 2019, Josef performed his first solo concert called 'My Name Is Mikolas Josef' in Prague. He performed his songs "Lie to Me", "Abu Dhabi", and "Me Gusta". He also performed new tracks, with one of them being "Acapella". After the show, people who were at the concert could decide their favorite new song to select as Mikolas Josef's new single.

Music video
A music video to accompany the release of "Acapella" was first released onto YouTube on 23 May 2019 at a total length of three minutes and twenty-five seconds. Josef directed, scripted, edited and operated the drone for the video.

Track listing

Charts

Weekly charts

Year-end charts

Certifications

Release history

References

2019 singles
2019 songs
Mikolas Josef songs
Number-one singles in the Czech Republic